HD 181433 is a star located approximately 87 light-years away in the constellation of Pavo (the Peacock). According to SIMBAD, it has a stellar classification of K3III-IV, which puts it on the borderline between being a red giant and a subgiant. This is inconsistent with the fact that its luminosity is only 0.308 times that of the Sun. Its entry in the Hipparcos catalogue lists a spectral type of K5V, classifying it as a dwarf star.  , three extrasolar planets are thought to be orbiting the star. There is currently little information on these planets.  The name of this star comes from its identifier in the Henry Draper catalogue.

Planetary system 
Orbiting the star are three planets, whose discovery was announced in 2008; the discovery paper was published in 2009. The inner planet has a mass at least 7.5 times that of Earth, and is termed a super-Earth (this classification is based solely on the mass of the planet and should not be taken to imply that the planet could support Earthlike conditions). The middle planet and the outer planet are gas giants. The orbital periods for three planets are 9.3743 days for a 7.56 ME planet, 962 days for a 0.64 MJ planet, and 2172 days for a 0.54 MJ planet. This solution is unstable, more data are required to constrain the orbital position of planet d.

See also
 HD 40307
 HD 47186
 MOA-2007-BLG-192L

Notes

References

External links 
 
 

 
K-type main-sequence stars
Planetary systems with three confirmed planets
Pavo (constellation)
Durchmusterung objects
0756.1
181433
095467